Attilio Fontana (born 28 March 1952) is an Italian politician from Varese, Lombardy. He has served as President of Lombardy since 2018 leading a centre-right coalition.

Biography

Early political career
A long-time member of Lega Lombarda and Lega Nord (LN), he was Mayor of Induno Olona from 1995 to 1999. Fontana, with LN, was elected in the 2000 regional election and 2005 regional election to the Regional Council of Lombardy, of which he functioned as President until July 2006.

Mayor of Varese
He stepped down from that office after being elected Mayor of Varese with 57.8% of the vote in the first round of 28 May 2006. He was re-elected in May 2011 with 53.8% of the vote in a run-off. Fontana, ineligible to run for reelection due to term limits, left the office in June 2016. In 2007 Fontana was the lawyer of Andrea Mascetti in the case against the left-wing journalist and television host Michele Santoro from who they won: with this court case Fontana obtained notoriety at national level.

2018 presidential election

Speculation
Some journalists in July 2016 speculated a nomination of Fontana as LN candidate in 2018 election for President of Lombardy if the incumbent Governor (President of Region) Roberto Maroni – who was elected in 2013 regional election for a five-year term with the support of Lega Lombarda and Lega Nord, the parties of Maroni and Fontana, and with the support of the others parties members of the 2013 center right coalition  – will not run for a second consecutive (and final) term; in January 2018, when Maroni announced his retirement from politics, Fontana was selected as Centre-right (composed by FI, LN, FdI, EpL, NcI and his civic personal list named "Fontana List" composed by members of PP, RC, MNS and also by civic, independent and non-partisans members) candidate to the Presidency of Lombardy. For the media, his experience as Mayor and Salvini's popularity are among the strengths of his candidacy.

General Election

On 15 January 2018, Fontana stated that the Western culture was in danger due to the migration flows from Africa. This created many protests as well as criticisms from the centre-left Democratic Party (PD) and the big tent anti-establishment Five Star Movement (M5S). Because of the controversy he apologised for his remarks, declaring that it was a slip of the tongue and an expressive error, not due to inherent racism of him or his party. Fontana's principal rivals were Giorgio Gori (PD) and Dario Violi (M5S).

On 4 March 2018 Fontana won 50% against Gori (29%) and Violi (17%) in the regional election and Fontana sworn in office as Governor on 26 March.

Presidency of Lombardy (2018present)
In October 2018, Fontana blocked, with his legal authority of Lombardy President, a Muslim association from turning a former hospital chapel into a mosque. In September 2020, a few weeks after the 2020 constitutional referendum on the cut in the number of parliamentarians linked to the reform initiated by the Conte I Cabinet led by the League with M5S and concluded by the Conte II Cabinet led by the coalition between M5S and PD, Fontana announces his vote against, in dissent with the official line of the League (established by Salvini), lined up for the "Yes".

Suspicion of abuse of power
In May 2019 the Prosecutor Office of Milan started an investigation on Fontana due to abuse of power as President of Lombardy in a case of corruption, but in March 2020 all the accusation falls and the case is definitively closed as the appointment in question did not constitute a crime.

Suspicion of fraud in public supplies
In July 2020 another investigation started, following the activities of Fontana, his wife and his brother in law during the COVID-19 pandemic. Some journalists in September 2020 speculated a retirement of Fontana from politics in 2023 - similar to Maroni's retirement in 2018 - in favour of Giancarlo Giorgetti or an early election due to the media hype due to the "Covid investigation", but Matteo Salvini (the Federal Secretary of Lega) prevented the resignment of Fontana from the Presidency of Lombardy and an early election.

On 2 December 2021, the Milan Public Prosecutor's Office requests the indictment of Fontana, for the crime of fraud in public supplies, after he had renounced being questioned by the investigators. On 13 May 2022 he was acquitted by the Milan GUP together with 4 other suspects (including his brother-in-law) because the fact does not exist.

Suspicion of self-laundering and misrepresentation
In March 2021, Fontana was entered in the register of suspects of the Milan Public Prosecutor's Office for self-laundering and false declaration in voluntary disclosure in reference to a suspected movement of money between Italy and Switzerland which took place starting from 2015. In February 2022, the case was closed; for the investigating judge of Milan, there are not enough elements to support the accusation against Fontana.

References

|-

|-

|-

1952 births
Living people
Lega Nord politicians
Presidents of the regional council of Lombardy
Mayors of Varese
People from Varese
Presidents of Lombardy